Nifty Airport or Camp Nifty Airport  is located adjacent to the Nifty Copper Mine, in the Pilbara region of Western Australia.

See also
 List of airports in Western Australia
 Aviation transport in Australia

References

External links
 Airservices Aerodromes & Procedure Charts

Pilbara airports 
Shire of East Pilbara